El Toro (Spanish for The Bull) is a wooden roller coaster located at Six Flags Great Adventure in Jackson Township, New Jersey. Designed by Werner Stengel and manufactured by Intamin, the ride opened to the public on June 11, 2006. Intamin subcontracted Rocky Mountain Construction (RMC) to build the ride, and the coaster's track was prefabricated, allowing for quicker installation and lower construction costs. El Toro is the main attraction of the Mexican-themed section of the park, Plaza Del Carnaval. It replaced another roller coaster, Viper, which closed following the 2004 season.

When it opened, El Toro had the steepest drop of any wooden roller coaster in the world at 76 degrees, a record that was later broken by T Express at Everland in 2008. Among wooden coasters, its height of  ranks fourth, its drop height of  ranks second, and its maximum speed of  ranks third. The coaster has been well-received, and with the exception of its first two years of operation, has consistently ranked in the top three of the annual Golden Ticket Awards publication from Amusement Today.

History
El Toro sits on the former site of Viper, which closed in 2004. All components of Viper were removed in early 2005, except for the station. El Toro was announced on September 28, 2005, along with Bugs Bunny National Park, a new themed area for children. It was also announced El Toro would be part of a new themed area known as Plaza del Carnaval, which would also include the adjacent wooden racing coaster, Rolling Thunder. Al Rubano, the director of Six Flags Great Adventure's construction committee, oversaw the ride's construction. The ride started testing on Memorial Day weekend in 2006. The ride had a surprise opening on June 11, then held its grand opening on June 12.

El Toro uses the same station as Viper, the coaster that formerly stood on the site. El Toro also sits partially on land once shared by Great Adventure's first wooden coaster, Rolling Thunder.

Description
El Toro carries a Mexican theme, and its name translates to "The bull" in Spanish. Each train has a bull's head ornament mounted on the front. The line queue of the ride is surrounded by Southwestern-style buildings of Plaza del Carnaval, and it features abandoned "wagon wheels" and Spanish posters along a wall separating the queue from the ride.

Ride layout

After departing from the station, the train makes a turn to the left, passing through the ride's structure. Once the entire train is on the lift the cable increases its speed to around 13 mph. Once at the top of the lift the speed of the cable gently slows down, but it is barely noticeable on the ride. After cresting the top of the lift, the train briefly travels forward and makes a 180 degree turn to the left. As the train reaches the bottom of the drop, it comes close to the track above, creating a headchopper-effect. It then rises and then travels through a 180 degree downward-banked turn to the right, and up another banked turn to the left. The train goes through a small second hill that speeds past the station and the lakeside. The train then makes another turn and up a smaller hill where riders experience -2 g forces on an ejector airtime hill, crossing over the former Rolling Thunder track. After coming down the drop, the train snakes through twists and turns. After coming out of the twister section, the train slows down as it moves through small "S" curve camelback hills and into the brake run.

Trains
El Toro operates two trains, labeled A and B, each with six cars per train. Riders are arranged two across in three rows for a total of 36 riders per train. It has a theoretical capacity of 1,200 guests per hour. One train has Kia Soul advertising wrapped onto the train itself. The other train has the classic train design, featuring the bull horns on the front of the train. The trains have padded "wings" at shoulder level to prevent riders from being thrown too far to the side in the final twister section.

In 2010, one of the trains was re-themed to endorse Stride Gum. The train was wrapped in Stride Gum advertisements, showing a different flavor of Stride gum on each car. The advertisements remained on the train for the entire 2011 season, but were removed before the start of the 2012 season and replaced with Kia Soul advertising.

Track

El Toro is very different from a traditional wooden roller coaster because it uses prefabricated wooden track. It was built and designed by Intamin, who also worked with employees of Rocky Mountain Construction to build the ride. Instead of carpenters cutting, shaping, and laying down the track on site by hand, the track is laser cut in a factory. This means that the track is manufactured to a higher degree of precision than could be achieved by hand. The "Plug and Play" aspect of the coaster speeds its construction, since track does not have to be completely manufactured on site. In addition, because of the speed of construction, the costs of building the coaster are lowered due to fewer man-hours spent on its construction. The riders are subject to a coaster whose track is as smooth as steel. El Toro is the first Intamin "Plug and Play" (Pre-Fab) wooden roller coaster in the United States and one of four in the world. The other three are Colossos at Heide Park in Germany, Balder at Liseberg in Sweden, and T Express at Everland in South Korea.

Records
When El Toro debuted, it broke records as the second-tallest and fastest with the second-longest drop of a wooden roller coaster in the United States. , El Toro has the third fastest speed, the third-tallest lift, and the second longest drop.

Incidents
After El Toro suffered a malfunction with the lift motor in early August 2013, the roller coaster was closed for several weeks. The motor was sent to Intamin's American headquarters in Maryland for repairs.

On June 29, 2021, a train partially derailed when the rear car's up-stop wheels, which are designed to prevent the train from lifting off the track, moved out of place and up onto the track. The cause of the accident was not released to the public, as the information was considered "proprietary", but all riders were able to safely exit the ride. El Toro was closed for most of Six Flags Great Adventure's 2021 operating season, pending the outcome of an investigation from Intamin. Although the park was not fined for the accident itself, the park was fined $5,000 for failure to immediately notify the New Jersey Department of Community Affairs following the incident. In early 2022, it was announced that El Toro would reopen on April 2, 2022.

On August 25, 2022, a malfunction occurred near the end of the ride, causing minor injuries to 14 riders, with five taken to a nearby hospital. The park closed the ride indefinitely, pending an investigation into the incident. An anonymous ride operator alleged that issues from previous incidents had not been fixed, saying in an interview with WCBS-TV: "The employees keep telling them that there is an issue with the pothole and maintenance has done nothing about it." Six Flags officials reported on August 30, 2022, that El Toro's safety systems were working properly and that the ride would reopen after it had been repaired. In September 2022, the New Jersey Department of Community Affairs (DCA) said El Toro was "structurally compromised", which would force El Toro to remain closed indefinitely. The DCA said it would also conduct an engineering review of El Toro and consult with Intamin. Six Flags officials said they expected to reopen the ride for the 2023 season.

Awards and rankings
When the ride debuted, it ranked 3rd for "Best New Ride of 2006" in the Golden Ticket Awards.

References

External links

Six Flags Great Adventure El Toro ride page
El Toro Detailed Review

Six Flags Great Adventure
Roller coasters operated by Six Flags
Roller coasters in New Jersey
Roller coasters introduced in 2006
2006 establishments in New Jersey